Pichai may refer to:

M. Mariam Pichai, the environment minister in Tamil Nadu
Sundar Pichai, chief executive officer at Google Inc.
Pichai Pituwong, Thai football coach
Pichai Sayotha, Thai amateur boxer

See also 
Phichai (disambiguation)